The Tragical History of the Life and Death of Doctor Faustus, commonly referred to simply as Doctor Faustus, is an Elizabethan tragedy by Christopher Marlowe, based on German stories about the title character Faust. It was probably written in 1592 or 1593, shortly before Marlowe's death. Two different versions of the play were published in the Jacobean era several years later.

Performance
The Admiral's Men performed  24 times in the three years between October 1594 and October 1597. On 22 November 1602, the diary of Philip Henslowe recorded a £4 payment to Samuel Rowley and William Bird for additions to the play, which suggests a revival soon after that date.

The powerful effect of the early productions is indicated by the legends that quickly accrued around them. In Histriomastix, his 1632 polemic against the drama, William Prynne records the tale that actual devils once appeared on the stage during a performance of Faustus, "to the great amazement of both the actors and spectators". Some people were allegedly driven mad, "distracted with that fearful sight." John Aubrey recorded a related legend, that Edward Alleyn, lead actor of The Admiral's Men, devoted his later years to charitable endeavours, like the founding of Alleyn's College, in direct response to this incident.

Text
Given its source in the Historia von D. Johann Fausten, published as a chapbook in Germany in 1587, and the fact that the earliest known translation of the latter work into English was in 1592, the play was probably written in 1592 or 1593.  It may have been entered into the Stationers' Register on 18 December 1592, though the records are confused and appear to indicate a conflict over the rights to the play. A subsequent Stationers' Register entry, dated 7 January 1601, assigns the play to the bookseller Thomas Bushnell, the publisher of the 1604 first edition. Bushnell transferred his rights to the play to John Wright on 13 September 1610.

The two versions
Two versions of the play exist:
 The 1604 quarto, printed by Valentine Simmes for Thomas Law; this is usually called the A text. The title page attributes the play to "Ch. Marl.". A second edition (A2) of first version was printed by George Eld for John Wright in 1609. It is merely a direct reprint of the 1604 text. The text is short for an English Renaissance play, only 1485 lines long.
 The 1616 quarto, published by John Wright, the enlarged and altered text; usually called the B text. This second text was reprinted in 1619, 1620, 1624, 1631, and as late as 1663. Additions and alterations were made by the minor playwright and actor Samuel Rowley and by William Borne (or Birde), and possibly by Marlowe himself.

The 1604 version was once believed to be closer to the play as originally performed in Marlowe's lifetime, simply because it was older. By the 1940s, after influential studies by Leo Kirschbaum and W. W. Greg, the 1604 version came to be regarded as an abbreviation and the 1616 version as Marlowe's original fuller version. Kirschbaum and Greg considered the A-text a "bad quarto", and thought that the B-text was linked to Marlowe himself. Since then scholarship has swung the other way, most scholars now considering the A-text more authoritative, even if "abbreviated and corrupt", according to Charles Nicholl.

The 1616 version omits 36 lines but adds 676 new lines, making it roughly one third longer than the 1604 version. Among the lines shared by both versions, there are some small but significant changes in wording; for example, "Never too late, if Faustus can repent" in the 1604 text becomes "Never too late, if Faustus will repent" in the 1616 text, a change that offers a very different possibility for Faustus's hope and repentance.

Another difference between texts A and B is the name of the devil summoned by Faustus. Text A states the name is generally "Mephistopheles", while the version of text B commonly states "Mephostophilis". The name of the devil is in each case a reference to Mephistopheles in Faustbuch, the source work, which appeared in English translation in about 1588.

The relationship between the texts is uncertain and many modern editions print both. As an Elizabethan playwright, Marlowe had nothing to do with the publication and had no control over the play in performance, so it was possible for scenes to be dropped or shortened, or for new scenes to be added, so that the resulting publications may be modified versions of the original script.

Comic scenes
In the past, it was assumed that the comic scenes were additions by other writers. However, most scholars today consider the comic interludes an integral part of the play, regardless of their author, and so they continue to be included in print. Their tone shows the change in Faustus's ambitions, suggesting Marlowe did at least oversee the composition of them. The clown is seen as the archetype for comic relief.

Sources
Doctor Faustus is based on an older tale; it is believed to be the first dramatisation of the Faust legend. Some scholars believe that Marlowe developed the story from a popular 1592 translation, commonly called The English Faust Book. There is thought to have been an earlier, lost German edition of 1587, the Historia von D. Johann Fausten, which itself may have been influenced by even earlier, equally ill-preserved pamphlets in Latin (such as those that likely inspired Jacob Bidermann's treatment of the damnation of the doctor of Paris, Cenodoxus (1602)).

Several soothsayers or necromancers of the late fifteenth century adopted the name Faustus, a reference to the Latin for "favoured" or "auspicious"; typical was Georgius Faustus Helmstetensis, calling himself astrologer and chiromancer, who was expelled from the town of Ingolstadt for such practices. Subsequent commentators have identified this individual as the prototypical Faustus of the legend.

Whatever the inspiration, the development of Marlowe's play is very faithful to the Faust Book, especially in the way it mixes comedy with tragedy.

However, Marlowe also introduced some changes to make it more original. He made four main additions:
Faustus's soliloquy, in Act 1, on the vanity of human science
Good and Bad Angels
The substitution of a Pageant of Devils for the seven deadly sins. He also emphasised Faustus's intellectual aspirations and curiosity, and minimised the vices in the character, to lend a Renaissance aura to the story.
The name Bruno in the rival Pope scenes recalls that of Giordano Bruno who was tried for heresy by the Inquisition and burnt at the stake in 1600. This reference indicates that Marlowe recognised the cosmic machinery of the Faust story as a reflection of terrestrial power and authority, by which dissidents were tortured and executed in the name of obedience and conformity.

Structure
The play is in blank verse and prose in thirteen scenes (1604) or twenty scenes (1616).

Blank verse is largely reserved for the main scenes; prose is used in the comic scenes. Modern texts divide the play into five acts; act 5 being the shortest. As in many Elizabethan plays, there is a chorus (which functions as a narrator), that does not interact with the other characters but rather provides an introduction and conclusion to the play and, at the beginning of some Acts, introduces events that have unfolded.

Along with its history and language style, scholars have critiqued and analysed the structure of the play. Leonard H. Frey wrote a document entitled In the Opening and Close of Doctor Faustus, which mainly focuses on Faustus's opening and closing soliloquies. He stresses the importance of the soliloquies in the play, saying: "the soliloquy, perhaps more than any other dramatic device, involved the audience in an imaginative concern with the happenings on stage". By having Doctor Faustus deliver these soliloquies at the beginning and end of the play, the focus is drawn to his inner thoughts and feelings about succumbing to the devil.

The soliloquies also have parallel concepts. In the introductory soliloquy, Faustus begins by pondering the fate of his life and what he wants his career to be. He ends his soliloquy with the solution: he will give his soul to the devil. Similarly in the closing soliloquy, Faustus begins pondering, and finally comes to terms with the fate he created for himself. Frey also explains: "The whole pattern of this final soliloquy is thus a grim parody of the opening one, where decision is reached after, not prior to, the survey".

Synopsis
The Chorus explains that Faustus was low-born, but quickly achieved a doctorate in theology at the University of Wittenberg. However, his interest in learning and his pride soon led him to necromancy.

In the first scene of the play, Faustus expresses his boredom and impatience with the various branches of knowledge and concludes that only magic is worth learning. He asks his servant Wagner to return with the magicians Valdes and Cornelius, who have been trying to interest him in magic for some time. While he waits, he is visited by a Good Angel, who tries to dissuade him from this path, and a Bad Angel, who encourages him. Valdes and Cornelius arrive and declare that if Faustus devotes himself to magic, great things are indeed possible with someone of Faustus's learning and intelligence.

While Faustus is at dinner with the magicians, two scholars notice Faustus's absence and ask Wagner about his whereabouts. When Wagner tells them he is with Valdes and Cornelius, the scholars worry that the magicians have corrupted him and leave to inform the rector of the university.

Faustus attempts to conjure a devil, and Mephistophilis arrives. Faustus believes that he has summoned him, but Mephistophilis says that he came of his own accord, and that he serves Lucifer, and cannot do anything without his leave. Faustus questions Mephistophilis about Lucifer and Hell, and tells him to speak to Lucifer and return. The next scene is a comedic reflection in which Wagner calls two devils, with which he scares the Clown into serving him.

Mephistophilis returns, and Faustus signs a contract in his own blood: Mephistophilis will serve him for 24 years, at which point Lucifer will claim him, body and soul. Once the contract is signed, Faustus asks for a wife, but Mephistophilis declines, saying marriage is "but a ceremonial toy"; he asks for books of knowledge, and Mephistophilis provides a single book. In the corresponding comedic scene, Robin, an ostler, has stolen a conjuring book, and plans mischief with it.

Faustus begins to waver and think about God, and is visited again by the Good and Bad Angels. Lucifer arrives to remind him of his contract, and entertains him with a show of the Seven Deadly Sins. Faustus and Mephistophilis then travel Europe, eventually arriving in Rome, where they play tricks on the Pope. Next, Robin and Rafe (A version) or Dick (B version), having been caught for stealing a goblet, call on Mephistophilis, who arrives and angrily turns them into animals before returning to attend on Faustus. Faustus has been called to the court of the Holy Roman Emperor, where he and Mephistophilis conjure Alexander the Great and his paramour and give a knight cuckold's horns for being a heckler. In the A version, the emperor asks Faust to relent, and he does; in the B version a longer scene follows in which the knight and his friends attack Faustus; all are given horns. In both versions, Faustus then plays tricks on a horse dealer. Faustus and Mephistophilis then put on a magic show for the Duke and Duchess of Vanholt.

When Faustus's 24 years are nearly up, he bequeaths his possessions to Wagner. He conjures Helen of Troy for some students, and, when he starts to think of repenting again, renews his pledge to Lucifer and asks Mephistophilis for Helen as his lover. In the final scene, Faustus admits to some scholars that he has bargained away his soul; despite their prayers, the devils come for him.

The Calvinist/anti-Calvinist controversy
The theological implications of Doctor Faustus have been the subject of considerable debate. Among the most complicated points of contention is whether the play supports or challenges the Calvinist doctrine of absolute predestination, which dominated the lectures and writings of many English scholars in the latter half of the sixteenth century. According to Calvin, predestination meant that God, acting of his own free will, elects some people to be saved and others to be damned—thus, the individual has no control over his own ultimate fate. This doctrine was the source of great controversy because it was seen by the so-called anti-Calvinists to limit man's free will in regard to faith and salvation, and to present a dilemma in terms of theodicy.

At the time Doctor Faustus was performed, this doctrine was on the rise in England, and under the direction of Puritan theologians at Cambridge and Oxford had come to be considered the orthodox position of the Church of England. Nevertheless, it remained the source of vigorous and, at times, heated debate between Calvinist scholars, such as William Whitaker and William Perkins, and anti-Calvinists, such as William Barrett and Peter Baro. The dispute between these Cambridge intellectuals had quite nearly reached its zenith by the time Marlowe was a student there in the 1580s, and likely would have influenced him deeply, as it did many of his fellow students.

Concerning the fate of Faustus, the Calvinist concludes that his damnation was inevitable. His rejection of God and subsequent inability to repent are taken as evidence that he never really belonged to the elect, but rather had been predestined from the very beginning for reprobation. For the Calvinist, Faustus represents the worst kind of sinner, having tasted the heavenly gift and rejected it. His damnation is justified and deserved because he was never truly adopted among the elect. According to this view, the play demonstrates Calvin's "three-tiered concept of causation," in which the damnation of Faustus is first willed by God, then by Satan, and finally, by himself.

Themes and motifs 
"Ravished" by magic (1.1.112), Faustus turns to the dark arts when law, logic, science, and theology fail to satisfy him. According to Charles Nicholl this places the play firmly in the Elizabethan period when the problem of magic ("liberation or damnation?") was a matter of debate, and when Renaissance occultism aimed at a furthering of science. Nicholl, who connects Faustus as a "studious artisan" (1.1.56) to the "hands-on experience" promoted by Paracelsus, sees in the former a follower of the latter, a "magician as technologist".

Mephistophilis

Mephistophilis is a demon whom Faustus conjures up while first using magic. Readers initially feel sympathy for the demon when he attempts to explain to Faustus the consequences of abjuring God and Heaven. Mephistophilis gives Faustus a description of Hell and the continuous horrors it possesses; he wants Faustus to know what he is getting himself into before going through with the bargain:

Think’st thou that I who saw the face of God
And tasted the eternal joy of heaven
Am not tormented with ten thousand hells
In being deprived of everlasting bliss?
O Faustus, leave these frivolous demands
Which strikes a terror to my fainting soul! 

However, Faustus believes that supernatural powers are worth a lifetime in Hell:

Say he (Faustus) surrender up to him (Lucifer) his soul
So he will spare him four and twenty years,
Letting him live in all voluptuousness
Having thee (Mephistophilis) ever to attend on me 

Some scholars argue that Mephistophilis depicts the sorrow that comes with separation from God. Mephistophilis is foreshadowing the pain Faustus would have to endure, should he go through with his plan. In this facet, Faustus can be likened to Icarus, whose ambition was the source of his misery and the cause of his death.

Adaptations
The first television adaptation was broadcast in 1947 by the BBC starring David King-Wood as Faustus and Hugh Griffith as Mephistopheles. In 1958, another BBC television version starred William Squire as Faustus in an adaptation by Ronald Eyre intended for schools. In 1961, the BBC adapted the play for television as a two-episode production starring Alan Dobie as Faustus; this production was also meant for use in schools.

The play was adapted for the screen in 1967 by Richard Burton and Nevill Coghill, who based the film on an Oxford University Dramatic Society production in which Burton starred opposite Elizabeth Taylor as Helen of Troy.

There have been several adaptations on BBC Radio and elsewhere:
 The very first production on BBC Radio was broadcast on 29 June 1932, directed by Barbara Burnham with Ion Swinley as Faustus.
 The Oxford University Dramatic Society broadcast a production on the BBC National Programme on 13 April 1934 with R. F. Felton as Faustus and P.B.P. Glenville as Mephistopheles.
 The BBC Third Programme broadcast an adaptation on 11 October 1946 with Alec Guinness as Faustus and Laidman Browne as Mephistophilis, Rupert Davies as Lucifer and Donald Gray as the Emperor of Germany.
 A second BBC Third Programme adaptation was broadcast on 18 October 1949 with Robert Harris as Faustus, Peter Ustinov as Mephistophilis, Rupert Davies as Lucifer and Donald Gray as the Emperor of Germany.
 The BBC Home Service broadcast a production on 1 June 1964 with Stephen Murray as Faustus and Esme Percy as Mephistophilis.
 On 24 December 1995, BBC Radio 3 broadcast an adaptation of the play with Stephen Moore as Faustus, Philip Voss as Mephistopheles and Maurice Denham as the Old Man.
 An adaptation was broadcast on BBC Radio 3 on 23 September 2007, this time with Paterson Joseph as Faustus, Ray Fearon as Mephistopheles, Toby Jones as Wagner, Janet McTeer as the Evil Angel and Anton Lesser as the Emperor.
 American composer Mary McCarty Snow (1928-2012) composed music for a Texas Tech University production of Dr. Faustus.
 A production, adapted and directed by Emma Harding with John Heffernan as both Faustus and Mephistopheles, Pearl Mackie as Wagner, Tim McMullan as Cornelius/Emperor Charles V/Covetousness, Simon Ludders as Valdes/Beelzebub/Knight and Frances Tomelty as the Good Angel, was broadcast on BBC Radio 3 on 19 September 2012.
 The Canadian Broadcasting Corporation broadcast a full radio adaptation of the play with Kenneth Welsh as Faustus and Eric Peterson as Mephistopheles, later releasing it on audio cassette in 2001 as part of its "Great Plays of the Millennium" series.
 Two live performances in London have been videotaped and released on DVD: one at the Greenwich Theatre in 2010 and one at the Globe Theatre in 2011 starring Paul Hilton as Faustus and Arthur Darvill as Mephistopheles.
 In 2020 the Beyond Shakespeare Company released on line a play-reading and discussion of the A Text.

Critical history

Doctor Faustus has raised much controversy due to its alleged interaction with the demonic realm. Before Marlowe, there were few authors who ventured into this kind of writing. After his play, other authors began to expand on their views of the spiritual world.

See also
Solamen miseris socios habuisse doloris, a line from the play commonly translated as "misery loves company"

Notes

References

 Chambers, E. K. The Elizabethan Stage. 4 Volumes, Oxford, Clarendon Press, 1923.
 Logan, Terence P., and Denzell S. Smith, eds. The Predecessors of Shakespeare: A Survey and Bibliography of Recent Studies in English Renaissance Drama. Lincoln, NE, University of Nebraska Press, 1973.

External links

 
 
 1616 quarto online
 
 
 Louis Ule, A Concordance to the Works of Christopher Marlowe, Georg Olms Verlag, Hildesheim-New York, 1979, pp. 101–184.
 

1590s plays
1604 plays
Plays by Christopher Marlowe
English Renaissance plays
Works based on the Faust legend
Fiction about invisibility
British plays adapted into films
Cultural depictions of Charles V, Holy Roman Emperor
Tragedy plays